Christine Rawak is the athletic director at the University of Delaware.  She became the university's sixth director of Athletics and the first woman to hold the role on a permanent basis.

College
At the University of Michigan, Rawak was a member of the swimming and diving team and student government president, before earning her bachelor's degree in sports management and communications in 1992. She became an assistant swim coach at the university after graduation. She earned a master's degree in communication from Northwestern University.

Family
Rawak is married to Glenn Hill and the couple are parents of Blake, Evelyn, and Grace. Hill was a gymnast at the University of Michigan.

See also
 List of NCAA Division I athletic directors

References

External links
 Delaware profile

Year of birth missing (living people)
Living people
Michigan Wolverines women's swimmers
Northwestern University alumni
Delaware Fightin' Blue Hens athletic directors
Women college athletic directors in the United States
Michigan Wolverines swimming coaches
Place of birth missing (living people)